The 2000 London Marathon was the 20th running of the annual marathon race in London, United Kingdom, which took place on Sunday, 16 April. The elite men's race was won by Portugal's António Pinto in a time of 2:06:36 hours and the women's race was won by Kenya's Tegla Loroupe in 2:24:33. 

In the wheelchair races, Britain's Kevin Papworth (1:41:50) and Sarah Piercy (2:23:30) won the men's and women's divisions, respectively.

Around 93,000 people applied to enter the race, of which 42,596 had their applications accepted and 32,620 started the race. A total of 31,561 runners finished the race, comprising 24,613 men and 6948 women.

Results

Men

Women

Wheelchair men

Wheelchair women

References

Results
Results. Association of Road Racing Statisticians. Retrieved 2020-04-18.

External links

Official website

2000
London Marathon
Marathon
London Marathon